Saia Ma’u Piukala is a Tongan politician, surgeon, and Cabinet Minister. 

Piukala was trained as a surgeon at the Fiji School of Medicine in Suva, Fiji. Before entering politics he worked as a surgeon for the Tongan Ministry of  Health. He was first elected to the Legislative Assembly of Tonga as representative for Vavaʻu 14 in the 2014 Tongan general election and was appointed Minister of Health in the cabinet of ʻAkilisi Pōhiva. He was re-elected in the 2017 election and reappointed as Minister of Health and Public Enterprises. In January 2019 a minor reshuffle saw him swap his Public Enterprises portfolio for Internal Affairs.

In May 2019 Piukala was appointed to the World Health Organization executive board.

Following the death of ʻAkilisi Pōhiva and his replacement by Pohiva Tuʻiʻonetoa in October 2019 he was not reappointed to Tuʻiʻonetoa's new Cabinet.

He was re-elected in the 2021 election. On 28 December 2021 he was appointed to the Cabinet of Siaosi Sovaleni as Minister of Health.

References

Living people
Members of the Legislative Assembly of Tonga
Ministers of Health of Tonga
Fiji School of Medicine alumni
People from Vavaʻu
Year of birth missing (living people)